Established on June 16, 2007, the SME Infocomm Resource Centre (Abbreviation: SIRC), is a not-for-profit organisation that seeks to help Small and Medium Enterprises (SMEs) in Singapore to advance their use of Info-Communications Technology (ICT).

Launched by then-MICA minister Dr Lee Boon Yang, the vision behind SIRC was for Singapore SMEs to become active users of ICT technologies, and to help them to use the Internet to improve their operations and market their companies at home and abroad. The first SIRC (SIRC@SP) at Singapore Polytechnic is jointly created by IDA and Singapore Polytechnic.

The SME Infocomm Resource Centre is modeled after organizations such as the MIRC, APEC Center for Technology Exchange and Training for SMEs and APEC SME Innovation Centre

SIRC seeks to reach out to existing SMEs and new start-up SMEs in Singapore through a series public workshop programmes. In addition, the SIRC assists SMEs by providing technical resources to companies embarking on innovative and prototype ICT applications. Local industries have been encouraged in several minister speeches to take advantage of the services by the SIRC and other government assistance schemes.

Key programmes
The SIRC@SP is involved in several key initiatives under the Infocomm@SME programme by the Infocomm Development Authority of Singapore. A recent IDA survey (circa 2006) showed that more could be done to help Singapore ’s small & medium enterprises, or SMEs, tap the power of infocomm technology. IDA had launched a new Infocomm@SME programme. This programme is not just to equip SMEs with basic ICT know-how. Infocomm@SME is aimed at helping SMEs to explore the latest ICT technologies and solutions to transform and enhance their businesses.

SIRC Workshops
The SIRC Workshops are an important means to achieving the mission of the SIRC. The workshops are conducted by industry experts in various fields. The topics of the workshops include:
 Creating business value using Web 2.0
 Infocomm Security
 E-Commerce and E-Payment
 Improving Business Operations through Accounting Software
 Search Engine Marketing

SIRC Application Jumpstart
IDA’s survey of SMEs found that many local SMEs faced difficulties in starting innovative projects because of the high cost of manpower in Singapore. Many SMEs also face difficulties in recruiting and keeping talented technical staff. The SIRC helps to bridge the gap by providing technical expertise to help in project implementations. Funding for such projects can come from SPRING Singapore. Government assistance includes funding from SPRING Singapore under the LETAS and TIP programmes.

See also
 Interactive & Digital Media Centre
 Ministry of Information, Communications and the Arts (Singapore)
 Government of Singapore
 Economy of Singapore

References

External links
SME Infocomm Resource Centre Homepage
Infocomm@SME Programme (IDA)
APEC SME Innovation Centre
Why Do Business In Singapore
APEC Center for Technology Exchange and Training for SMEs 
MIRC

Business organisations based in Singapore
Organizations related to small and medium-sized enterprises